The Ukrainian Engineering Pedagogics Academy (UEPA) is a Ukrainian academy in Kharkiv.

The postal address is: Kharkiv, 61003 vul. Universitets’ka, 16.

History
On 24 January 1958, UEPA was founded firstly as Ukrainian Extramural Polytechnic Institute (UEPI). In 1990, UEPI was transformed into the Kharkov Engineering Pedagogics Institute (KEPI). In 1994, the Academy received IV accreditation level and the status of Ukrainian Engineering Pedagogics Academy (UEPA).

Campuses and buildings
The campus consists of the following facilities:

The main building, including the Rector’s office and administration;
The 1st building, including power engineering, technological faculties, and the faculty of computer technologies in management and education;
The 2nd building, including the faculty of international educational programs, faculty of integrated technologies in production and education, scientific library, and reading hall; 
The 3rd building, including the admissions department, sports hall, and gym;
The 4th building, including the faculty of economic, administrative and educational technologies, concert hal,l and canteen;
Stadium;
Three hostels.

Institutes and faculties
The Academy includes:

Two institutes:
Educational-Scientific  Professional-Pedagogics Institute  which is situated in Bakhmut and Slaviansk cities;
Stakhanov Educational-Scientific Institute of Mining and Educational Technologies. 
Five faculties:
power engineering faculty;
faculty of economic, administrative and educational technologies; 
technological faculty;
faculty of international educational programs;
faculty of integrated technologies in production and education.

Honorable Doctors and famous alumni
Mostovyi, P. I. – minister, head of the State Committee of Material resources of USSR;
Yefremov, V.P. – bonding minister of USSR;
Topolov, V.S. – minister of coal industry of USSR;
Potapov, V.I. – deputy of Verkhovna Rada of Ukraine;
Reva, D.A. – deputy of Verkhovna Rada of Ukraine.

Awards and reputation
UEPA has received the following ratings:

Rating of the universities of Ukraine "Top-200 Ukraine"  2007 – the 77th place;
Rating of the higher education establishments from UNESCO "Top-200 of Ukraine" 2011 – the 74th place;
Rating of  the higher educational establishments  of Ukraine «Compass 2011» – general rating – the 10th place;
Rating of the higher education establishments  of Ukraine «Compass 2012» – the summary rating – the 10th place;
Rating of the official publication of the Ministry of Education, Science, Youth and Sports «Education  of Ukraine» 2012 – global criterion of  rating (IPI) in  the groups of pedagogical, humanitarian, physical training and sports of the higher educational establishments – 0,895;
Rating of the newspaper “Segodna” 2012 – the 10th place among the higher educational establishments with the best training on engineering specialties, IT specialties, on economic preparation.

References

1958 establishments in Ukraine
Educational institutions established in 1958
Universities in Ukraine
Universities and colleges in Kharkiv